On the evening of 2 September 2019, a bomb on a tractor killed 16 people and injured 119 others at a housing compound used by international organisations in Kabul, Afghanistan.
The target of the attack was foreign citizens living in the town; five Nepalis, two Britons and a 43-year-old Romanian diplomat were killed in the attack. Twenty-five other foreign residents were wounded, including another Romanian.

On 5 September 2019, at least 12 people, including an American service member and a Romanian soldier, were killed and more than 40 injured when a suicide car bomber exploded in a heavily fortified area of central Kabul, close to the Afghan security offices. The Taliban claimed responsibility for the attacks.

See also 
 List of terrorist attacks in Kabul

References 

2 and 5 September bombings
2019 murders in Afghanistan
2 and 5 September 2019 bombings
21st-century mass murder in Afghanistan
2 and 5 September 2019 bombings
Mass murder in 2019
2 and 5 September 2019 bombings
September 2019 crimes in Asia
September 2019 events in Afghanistan
Suicide bombings in 2019
2 and 5 September 2019
Suicide car and truck bombings in Afghanistan
Taliban attacks